Zoya Kholshevnikova (December 31, 1920 - June 12, 1991) is a former Soviet female speed skater. She won a silver medal at the World Allround Speed Skating Championships for Women in 1949, and a bronze medal in 1948.

She has broken once the 3000 m world record.

References

1920 births
1991 deaths
Soviet female speed skaters
Burials in Troyekurovskoye Cemetery
World Allround Speed Skating Championships medalists
Honoured Masters of Sport of the USSR